La pattuglia dell'Amba Alagi (i. e. "The Patrol of Amba Alagi") is a 1953 Italian war melodrama film written and directed by Flavio Calzavara and starring Luciano Tajoli and Milly Vitale.  It was a commercial success, as it grossed 469,2 million lire at the Italian box office.

Plot

Cast 

 Luciano Tajoli as Luciano
 Milly Vitale as  Maria
 Dante Maggio as  Ciccillo
 Giorgio De Lullo as  Carlo
 Olga Solbelli as  Carmela 
 Aldo Silvani as  Giovanni's Old Teacher
 Roberto Mauri as  Turi
 Carla Calò as  Elena
 Nino Pavese as The Major
 Anna Campori as  The Major's Wife
  Mario Terribile as  Giovanni
  Annette Ciarli as  Marianina
 Nino Milano as  Carmine

References

External links

Italian war drama films
1950s war drama films
East African campaign (World War II) films
Films directed by Flavio Calzavara
1953 drama films
1953 films
Italian black-and-white films
Melodrama films
Italian World War II films
1950s Italian films